Gabriela Horn (born 25 January 1988), known professionally as Paenda (pronounced "panda"; stylised as Pænda and in all caps), is an Austrian singer, songwriter and music producer. She represented Austria in the Eurovision Song Contest 2019 with the song "Limits", which was released on 8 March.

Life and career 
Horn was born in January 1988, in Deutschlandsberg, Styria. She started singing in a choir in her home town at the age of six. At fourteen, she began songwriting and singing in various pop rock bands. She currently lives in Vienna, writing, composing and producing her music at her home studio. Horn records and writes all of her own songs.

Eurovision
In 2019, Horn was chosen by a team of music experts and broadcaster ORF to represent Austria at the 64th Eurovision Song Contest in Tel Aviv. She performed her song "Limits", which finished second last with 21 points, and as a result did not qualify for the final.

Discography

Album

Extended plays

Singles

References

External links 

 

Eurovision Song Contest entrants of 2019
Eurovision Song Contest entrants for Austria
Living people
1988 births
21st-century Austrian women singers
Austrian pop singers
Austrian electronic musicians